The following is an episode list of the Australian comedy program Kath & Kim, initially on ABC TV, and as of 2007, on the Seven Network. 

There have been four series of eight episodes each, one telemovie, and one movie. The first three series and the telemovie ran on ABC from 2002 to 2005. The fourth series initially aired on the Seven Network in 2007, and the movie was released in 2012. A two-part 20th anniversary special aired in 2022.

Series overview

Episodes

Season 1 (2002)

Season 2 (2003)

Season 3 (2004)

Da Kath & Kim Code

Riley and Turner planned to take 2005 off from television, but in July, they announced that they would be writing and filming a 90-minute telemovie. The movie aired on 27 November 2005, and was the ABC's top rated program for 2005, achieving an average audience of 2.1 million and a peak audience of 2.4 million. The telemovie screened in New Zealand in December and was sold to networks in the United Kingdom and the United States. It was the last Kath & Kim production shown on the ABC before it moved to the Seven Network. 

Kel and Kath return from The Da Vinci Code European tour and begin frantic preparations for Christmas. During the two weeks leading up to Christmas Day Kim discovers that Brett is once again having an affair, this time with his boss Kelly. Brett stays at "The Buckingham Motel". Kim eventually asks him back, but he is still conducting the affair. Sharon meets a man, Marriat, online and they become engaged. She is heart broken to later learn that he does not actually exist, but is just a blog. Kath and Kel become backup dancers for Michael Bublé at Carols by Candlelight, Melbourne. Kath's affection for him results in Kel letting out his "green eyed monster". She tells him that he shouldn't bother going home as he wouldn't be welcome. Kel, too, goes to stay at "The Buckingham". Kath forgives Kel and he returns home for Christmas. Kath and Kel also receive strange messages from John Monk (Barry Humphries), the albino running Da Vinci Code tour, including one saying "44 Euros". John Monk visits their home. Kel thinks he has cracked the code and Monk is going to kill them, but he just wants to offer them a franchise. An epilogue shows Kath's first day as a tour guide on the Da Vinci Code 2 tour: G'day Leonardo.

The telemovie featured a number of notable Australian guest cast including Rove McManus, Rhonda Burchmore and The Wiggles.

Da Kath and Kim Code was released to DVD as a 2-disc set on 1 December 2005, and was bundled with Kath & Kim Live in London. The DVD was briefly discontinued and repackaged again on 1 April 2010.

Season 4 (2007)
Following a break in 2006, Kath & Kim began shooting a fourth season with the series moving to the Seven Network. The season premiered on Sunday 19 August 2007 at 7:30 pm, attracting an Australian audience of 2.521 million nationally. Sharon and Kim appear on fellow Seven Network show Deal or No Deal in a few specially-filmed scenes. Special guests to feature in this season include Matt Lucas, Shane Warne, Rob Sitch, Andrew O'Keefe, Eric Bana, Maggie Beer, Shannon Bennett, Bill Granger, Donna Hay and Kylie Kwong.

Specials (2022)

References

General
 Zuk, T. Kath & Kim: episode guide, Australian Television Information Archive. Retrieved 15 October 2007.
 TV.com editors. Kath & Kim Episode Guide, TV.com. Retrieved 15 October 2007.
 IMDb editors. Kath & Kim episode guide, Internet Movie Database. Retrieved 15 October 2007.
Specific

External links
 Official website
 Official BBC website
 

Lists of Australian comedy television series episodes